Wizard of Harlem is the third and final studio album by Loon release after leaving Bad Boy Records. It contains tracks such as "Jimmy" and "Kill You" that continue rivalries with fellow Harlem rappers Jim Jones, 40 Cal and Mase. The album's outro contains part of the on-air confrontation between Loon and 40 Cal on Miss Jones' show on Hot 97, concerning the shovel incident.

Track listing
"Wizard of Harlem"
"Calling Me Back"  
"Blap Blap" featuring I-Rocc & Smigg Dirtee
"Noodle Soup"
"Elmo"
"Jimmy"
"Code of the Streetz" featuring Smigg Dirtee
"Kill You"
"You Told Me"
"Shotie"
"Story"
"Outro"

References

2006 albums
Loon (rapper) albums